Ryōta Suzuki may refer to:

, Japanese voice actor
, Japanese footballer
, Japanese athlete